Events in the year 1625 in Norway.

Incumbents
Monarch: Christian IV

Events
 February 23 - : 210 fishermen is killed in a storm in the fjord Folda, Trøndelag.

Arts and literature

Births

 9 August – Hans Rosing, bishop (died 1699).
20 November – Tønne Huitfeldt, landowner and military officer (died 1677).

Full date unknown
Paul Peterson Paus, priest and poet (died 1682).

Deaths

See also

References